The Frog is a 1937 British crime film directed by Jack Raymond and starring Gordon Harker, Noah Beery, Jack Hawkins and Carol Goodner. The film is about the police chasing a criminal mastermind who goes by the name of The Frog, and the 1936 play version by Ian Hay. It was based on the 1925 novel The Fellowship of the Frog by Edgar Wallace. It was followed by a loose sequel The Return of the Frog, the following year.

Cast
 Gordon Harker as Sgt. Elk
 Noah Beery as Joshua Broad
 Jack Hawkins as Captain Gordon
 Carol Goodner as Lola Bassano
 Richard Ainley as Ray Bennett
 Vivian Gaye as Stella Bennett
 Esme Percy as Philo Johnson
 Felix Aylmer as John Bennett
 Cyril Smith as PC Balder
 Harold Franklyn as Hagen
 Gordon McLeod as Chief Commissioner
 Julien Mitchell as John Maitland

Critical reception
Writing for Night and Day in 1937, Graham Greene gave the film a poor review, describing it as "badly directed [and] badly acted". Greene admitted that it did have "an old-world charm", but characterized the "well-mannered dialogue [as] dron[ing] on".

Britmovie called it a "routine thriller"; while British Pictures wrote, "(it) suffers through being an adaptation of a theatre adaptation (by Ian Hay) of the original novel. Some of the exposition is clunky and at times confusing; and the direction needed someone like Walter Forde to make the most of it. Hawkins and Harker, in the roles they played on stage, hold it together."

See also
 Mark of the Frog (1928, film serial)
 Der Frosch mit der Maske (1959)

References

External links

1937 films
1937 crime films
Films based on works by Edgar Wallace
Films directed by Jack Raymond
Films shot at Pinewood Studios
British black-and-white films
British crime films
1930s English-language films
1930s British films
Films set in London
Films set in Essex